Shyam Sunder Jyani (born 1979) is an Indian environmentalist and academic, best known for afforestation efforts in the Indian state of Rajasthan. He is presently an associate professor of sociology at Dungar College, Bikaner.

Biography
He originated from a rural farming family in the village of 12 TK, Sri Ganganagar district. His involvement in environmental activities began in 2003, when he and some students revived a number of dying neem trees within Dungar College's campus. Afterwards, he began campaigning door-to-door for tree planting in Bikaner, and in 2006, he formulated the idea of "Familial Forestry", which involves local families by encouraging them to plant fruit trees at their homes as a "green member". The idea was launched at the village of Himtasar, where 120 households were part of the pilot project. The choice of fruit trees allowed the anti-desertification campaign to serve an additional purpose of improving the local villagers' nutrition. According to Jyani, educating the families on the benefits and the after-planting care of the trees increased the saplings' survival rate from 20–30% to 90%.

In order to further extend the campaign's reach, he incorporated the activity of tree planting in activities like Diwali. A mobile app has also been released to increase awareness of the afforestation drive and its benefits. On Gandhi's 150th birthday in 2019, he enrolled 150 schools in Rajasthan and their students in a tree-planting drive. His efforts have seen planting of more than 2.5 million saplings in north-western Rajasthan by 1 million families across 15,000 villages by 2021, with the greenery being visible from satellite imagery as a "green wall" at the margins of the Thar Desert. Most of the plants and necessary irrigation tanks were purchased on his own expense. In a 2021 interview with Deutsche Welle, he has also stated plans to expand tree-planting efforts to major cities.

Awards and honors
In recognition of his work, he was awarded the Indira Gandhi National Service Scheme Award in 2012, and later the Land for Life Award from the United Nations Convention to Combat Desertification in 2021.

References 

People from Sri Ganganagar district
Indian environmentalists
Rajasthan academics
Living people
People involved with desert greening
1979 births